Niall Callum James Peter Maher (born 31 July 1995) is an English professional footballer who plays as a defender for EFL League Two side Grimsby Town.

He has previously played in the Football League for Bolton Wanderers, Blackpool and Bury, as well as in the League of Ireland with Galway United and in non-league football with AFC Telford United and FC Halifax Town. He was voted as part of the National League team of the season for 2021–22.

Club career

Bolton Wanderers
Maher has been with Bolton Wanderers since the age of ten He made his first team debut on 2 April 2016 at home against Reading.

On 22 January 2015, Maher joined Blackpool in a one-month loan and he made his Football League debut as a 57th-minute substitute for Peter Clarke on 24 January 2015 in a 7–2 loss against Watford at Vicarage Road.

Bury
At the end of the 2015–16 season, Bolton confirmed that he would be leaving when his contract expired at the end of June. On 24 July 2016 it was confirmed that he had joined Bolton's close neighbours Bury on a twelve-month contract. He scored his first goal for Bury against Burton Albion in an EFL Cup tie on 10 August 2016.

Galway United
On 29 August 2017, Maher joined League of Ireland Premier Division side Galway United.

AFC Telford United
Maher briefly joined AFC Telford United in February 2018, making one appearance for the club, a 1-0 win over FC United of Manchester in the National League North.

FC Halifax Town
On 8 March 2018, Maher signed for National League side FC Halifax Town on a deal until the end of the 2017–18 season. On 18 August 2018, Maher extended his stay by agreeing a new two-year deal.

Halifax announced on 17 August 2020 that Maher extended his deal for a further two years.

Ahead of the 2021–22 season Maher was installed as the new club captain, replacing the departing Nathan Clarke. After advancing to the play-offs following a 4th place finish, Halifax were defeated by Chesterfield in the eliminator round, thus ending their bid to reach the Football League. Maher was voted into the National League Team of the Season.

On 6 June 2022, Maher announced he would be leaving Halifax following the conclusion of the 2021–22 season, he stated upon his departure "To be your captain over the last 18 months has been a massive honour. To the players - it's been one hell of a season with a great dressing room to manage and there is no doubt that you all deserve to be achieving the best in your careers whatever they may be."

Grimsby Town
On 15 June 2022, following their promotion to the Football League, Maher signed for Grimsby Town ahead of the 2022–23 season,  reportedly rejecting an offer from Oldham Athletic who were hopeful of signing him.

Career statistics

Honours
Individual
National League Team of the Year : 2021–22

References

External links

1995 births
Living people
English footballers
Association football defenders
Bolton Wanderers F.C. players
Blackpool F.C. players
Bury F.C. players
Galway United F.C. players
FC Halifax Town players
Grimsby Town F.C. players
English Football League players
League of Ireland players
National League (English football) players